Åke Leif Julin (13 October 1919 – 25 September 2008) was a Swedish water polo player. He was part of Swedish teams that finished fifth and ninth at the 1948 and 1952 Summer Olympics, respectively. His father Harald and elder brother Rolf were also Olympic water polo players.

References

1919 births
2008 deaths
Swedish male water polo players
Olympic water polo players of Sweden
Water polo players at the 1948 Summer Olympics
Water polo players at the 1952 Summer Olympics
Sportspeople from Stockholm
Stockholms KK water polo players